Soyurghatmïsh Khan (died 1384) was the khan of the Western Chagatai Khanate (1370–1384). He was the son of Danishmendji, of the House of Ogedei.

When Timur gained control of the territory of the Western Chagatai Khanate in the 1360s, he did not abolish the office of Khan. Instead, in order to legitimatize his authority, he placed on the throne Soyurgatmish, who was not a member of the house of Chagatai Khan, but from the house of Ogedei. Timur ruled as an amir in Soyurgatmish's name. The Khan, however, was only a ceremonial figure, and Timur held all of the power within the state. Upon Soyurgatmish's death in 1384, he was replaced by his son Sultan Mahmud.

His daughter Urun Sultan Khanika was married to Timur's son Miran Shah.

References

1384 deaths
Chagatai khans
14th-century monarchs in Asia
Year of birth unknown